Hub is an unincorporated community in Marion County, Mississippi, United States.

South of Hub is the Lower Little Creek, a tributary of the Pearl River.

Hub was never incorporated, and had a post office from 1899 to 1954.

A shortline logging railroad, constructed by Camp & Hinton Brothers in the 1880s, began in Hub and extended several miles south.  The Gulf and Ship Island Railroad, a mainline railroad, was built through Hub in 1899.

References

Unincorporated communities in Marion County, Mississippi
Unincorporated communities in Mississippi